
Gmina Rozogi is a rural gmina (administrative district) in Szczytno County, Warmian-Masurian Voivodeship, in northern Poland.

Villages
Gmina Rozogi contains the villages and settlements of Antonia, Borki Rozowskie, Dąbrowy, Faryny, Kiełbasy, Kilimany, Klon, Kokoszki, Kowalik, Księży Lasek, Kwiatuszki Wielkie, Lipniak, Łuka, Nowy Suchoros, Orzeszki, Radostowo, Rozogi, Spaliny Małe, Spaliny Wielkie, Wilamowo, Wujaki, Wysoki Grąd, Występ and Zawojki.

Neighbouring gminas
Gmina Rozogi is bordered by the gminas of Czarnia, Łyse, Myszyniec, Pisz, Ruciane-Nida, Świętajno, Szczytno and Wielbark.

References
Polish official population figures 2006

Rozogi
Szczytno County

de:Rozogi#Gmina